Heterhelus is a genus of short-winged flower beetles in the family Kateretidae. There are at least four described species in Heterhelus.

Species
These four species belong to the genus Heterhelus:
 Heterhelus abdominalis (Erichson, 1843)
 Heterhelus satoi Hisamatsu & Lee, 2007
 Heterhelus scutellaris (Heer, 1841)
 Heterhelus sericans (LeConte, 1869)

References

Further reading

External links

 

Kateretidae
Articles created by Qbugbot